is a passenger railway station located in the city of Kaizuka, Osaka Prefecture, Japan, operated by the private railway operator Mizuma Railway.

Lines

Layout
The station consists of one side platform serving a single bi-directional track.The station is unattended.

Adjacent stations

History
Sechigo Station opened on December 24, 1925.

Passenger statistics
In fiscal 2019, the station was used by an average of 1252 passengers daily.

Surrounding area
The area around the station is lined with historical houses. The surrounding roads are very narrow, especially near the entrance and exit of the station, which is too narrow for cars to pass.

See also
 List of railway stations in Japan

Reference

External links

 Schedule 

Railway stations in Japan opened in 1925
Railway stations in Osaka Prefecture
Kaizuka, Osaka